"Trampoline" is a song by Kero Kero Bonito, being the fourth single from their first studio album Bonito Generation (2016). It is a synth-pop and bubblegum pop song with elements of hip hop, video game music, J-pop, and Eurotrance.

Background and release
The song was released on 26 September 2016. The Saint Etienne remix was released as a part of the EP Bonito Retakes (Remixes) on 30 May 2017.

Composition
"Trampoline" has been described as a synth-pop and bubblegum pop song, that blends hip hop, video game music, J-pop, and Eurotrance with "charming lyrics" and "goofy raps".

Music video
The official video for the song was released on 25 October 2016 and uploaded to YouTube. It was directed by Theo Davies (who also directed the video for the band's song "Lipslap"). The video "start[s] off in a grey world until [the band members] discover an interdimensional trampoline that takes them to an alternate, confetti-spewed universe."

Reception
According to Luke McCormick of The Fader, "The sugary sweet, carefree synth pop track is all about picking yourself back up after falling down." Will Gottsegen of the site later praised the song's spoken-word breakdown, likening it to a "philosophic prescription for happiness". Leah Levinson of Tiny Mix Tapes called the single "a slyly tongue-in-cheek anthem that lands somewhere between an upbeat Calvin Harris hit and a Yo Gabba Gabba! lesson about trying our hardest." She praised the song's absurd lyrics, production style, and pop sensibilities.

Release history

References

2016 singles
2016 songs
Kero Kero Bonito songs